Daniel Tucker (February 14, 1740 – 1818) was a Methodist minister, farmer and ferryman as well as a captain during the American Revolution. Tucker ministered to slaves, and was possibly a source for the song "Old Dan Tucker".

As a young man Daniel Tucker came to Elbert County to take up a land grant and served as a captain in the American Revolution. Farming the rich land along the Savannah River, he became a capable farmer. At least one man was bound to Daniel Tucker to learn how to farm. One of his closest friends and neighbors was the former Governor of Georgia, Stephen Heard.

Tucker also ferried people across the Savannah River between the states of Georgia and South Carolina. Records in the Elbert County Courthouse show that in 1798, Tucker bought from Mr. John Heard for $1,000 in cash, part of the "Cook's Ferry Tract" with a ferry and all the items that went with it. The ferry was well situated and continued to serve the traveling public until bridges were built for the coming of automobiles.

Besides farming and carrying travelers across the river, Daniel Tucker was a  Methodist minister. He spent much of his time teaching slaves and praying with them. The song written about him called "Old Dan Tucker" has become a part of American folk music.

Daniel Tucker died in 1818 and was buried near his home. Today, his grave lies on a hill overlooking Lake Russell. "Old Dan Tucker's Grave" marks the burial site of Reverend Tucker in Elbert County. His grave site is located off Highway 72 east of Elberton, Georgia.

References

External links 
 Georgia Tourism - Old Dan Tucker's Grave
 Tucker Family Association - photo of Georgia Historical Marker

1740 births
1818 deaths
People from Elbert County, Georgia
People of Georgia (U.S. state) in the American Revolution
American Methodist clergy
Farmers from Georgia (U.S. state)